The Low Pay Commission (LPC) is an independent body in the United Kingdom, established in 1997, that advises the government on the National Minimum Wage. It is an advisory non-departmental public body of the Department for Business, Energy and Industrial Strategy (BEIS).

History and role 
The LPC was established in July 1997 on a non-statutory basis before being confirmed in legislation by the National Minimum Wage Act 1998.

Each year, the LPC advises the government on what rates the different minimum wages in the UK should be, announcing its recommendation six months before it would come into force. It is then up to the government to accept or reject the LPC's recommendations. In the past, the government has usually accepted the wage levels advocated by the LPC.

Structure
The LPC consists of nine Low Pay Commissioners who are selected by BEIS. The Commissioners are a mixture of employers, trade unionists and academics.

Chairs 
 2009 to 2017 – Sir David Norgrove
 2017 to present (2017 to 2019 as interim chair) – Bryan Sanderson

Proposals for reform 
In March 2014 the Resolution Foundation issued the report More Than A Minimum which proposed that the LPC's role should be expanded to include publishing the following:
An indication of its intentions for the minimum wage one year ahead. 
Analysis to show which sectors of the economy could afford to pay more than the minimum wage to encourage wage rises.
Advice for government on low pay policy in the same way that the Office of Budget Responsibility influences fiscal policy.

See also
 Minimum wage law

References

External links

 Catalogue of evidence submitted to the LPC, 1997–1998, held at the Modern Records Centre, University of Warwick

1997 establishments in the United Kingdom
Department for Business, Energy and Industrial Strategy
Government agencies established in 1997
Minimum wage law
Non-departmental public bodies of the United Kingdom government
Organisations based in the City of London